Fiend is a 1980 American B movie science fiction horror film directed and written by low-budget filmmaker Don Dohler, shot in Perry Hall, Maryland and starring Don Leifert, Elaine White, Richard Nelson, and George Stover.  The film had U.S. theatrical release in September 1980.

Plot
An evil spirit enters a graveyard and reanimates the corpse of music teacher Eric Longfellow (Don Leifert). However, in order to stay alive, he has to wrap his hands around his victims' throats to absorb their life essences.  When he moves to the suburbs of Baltimore, Maryland, his neighbor Gary Kender (Richard Nelson) begins to suspect something just is not right with Mr. Longfellow.

Main cast

 Don Leifert as Eric Longfellow
 Elaine White as Marsha Kender
 George Stover as Dennis Frye
 Richard Nelson as Gary Kender
 Del Winans as Jimmy Barnes
 Kim Dohler as Kristy Michaels
 Debbie Vogel as Helen Weiss
 Pam Dohler as Jane Clayton
 Greg Dohler as Scotty
 Richard Geiwitz as Fred
 Lydia Vuynovich as Angie 
 Steve Frith as Steve
 Anne Frith as Katie

Release

The film had U.S. theatrical release in September 1980. Later release included on U.S. VHS as Deadly Neighbor and in West Germany as Angst der Verlorenen.

Reception
Having years previously read an article about the making of Fiend, author Scott Phillips had wanted to see the film but had not been able to locate a copy.  When later as a staff writer at Monsters at Play, he found a copy and wrote  "So was it worth the 20+ -year wait? Two words: Holy Freakin' Hell, Yes. Any movie that delivers this kind of cheese-slathered drive-in goodness is gonna get the big thumbs-up from this li'l reviewer, you can count on that - and Fiend serves it up big", and went on to praise, plot, effects, lighting, and acting. He noted the film benefited from writer/director Don Dohler avoiding gore in favor of atmosphere, doing "a great job of delivering some creepy moments, one of which - involving a little girl behind Longfellow's house - will have you squirming in your seat. It gets goofy in places, but that's part of what makes it so enjoyable." The film is recommended for anyone loving old-school, late-nite horror films.  The DVD transfer of the original 16mm film was good considering the age of the original film stock, and includes a blooper reel, a still gallery, and the "gratuitous George Stover gallery" (there's also a great photo of the lovely "Miss Kim" (Fred Olen Ray's wife) on the Retromedia website link)."

Contrarily, when re-released and co-featured with The Alien Factor on DVD in 2005, DVD Talk compared the two films, and in finding T.A.F. almost likable, felt that Fiend was "an almost complete failure, primarily because it is much more dependent on Dohler's storytelling and direction, and his skills aren't up to the task in either department," concluding it was "little more than a backyard movie not worth anyone's time."

References

External links
 Fiend at the Internet Movie Database

1980 horror films
1980 films
American supernatural horror films
Films set in Maryland
1980s English-language films
Films directed by Don Dohler
1980s American films